The Santa Fe Dam Recreation Area is a county park located in Irwindale, California, USA, in the San Gabriel Valley, inside the Santa Fe Dam. The park and dam are nestled among gravel quarries in the area, many of which are currently inactive. The dam is a flood-control dam on the San Gabriel River. The dam functions as a dry dam most of the time. The San Gabriels produce more gravel than most other mountains. The park is maintained and operated by the Los Angeles County Department of Parks and Recreation. The park, located off the San Gabriel River Freeway (Interstate 605), contains a 70-acre (280,000 m2) lake for year-round fishing and non motorized watercraft.

The dam is a popular tourist attraction, most likely due to the views of the San Gabriel Mountains. Recreational activities at the park include seasonal swimming, fishing, non-motorized boating, cycling, birdwatching, and hiking. In 2005, the annual Renaissance Pleasure Faire of Southern California was relocated to the park from its long-established location at the Glen Helen Regional Park in Devore, California. The San Gabriel River Bike Trail runs through the recreation area. The bike path traces the rim of the dam around to the east of the flood basin and park, with access at Azusa Canyon Drive (main entrance to park)

Fish found in the lake include largemouth bass, bluegills, crappie, and carp. Rainbow trout are stocked in the cooler months, and channel catfish are stocked in the summer months. Some of the rare plants and wildlife found in the river fan include the alluvial fan sage scrub, cactus wrens, California gnatcatchers, scissor-tail flycatchers, horned lizards, and kangaroo rats.

Santa Fe Dam Nature Center
The focus of the Santa Fe Dam Nature Center is the plant life and wildlife of the alluvial fan of the San Gabriel River. The nature center is open Saturdays from 10 AM to 1 PM, and is operated by the San Gabriel Mountains Regional Conservancy. Programs include nature and bird walks, nature hobby presentations, insect identification, Tongva cultural history and other special programs.

References

External links
 Santa Fe Dam Recreational Area
 The Natural History of Santa Fe Dam Recreation Area
 Renaissance Pleasure Faire
 Streaming Water
 Santa Fe Dam Nature Center
 Santa Fe Dam Fishing
 San Gabriel River: Past and Present

Parks in Los Angeles County, California
Nature centers in California
Regional parks in California
San Gabriel River (California)
San Gabriel Valley
Irwindale, California